The basilar sulcus (groove for basilar artery) is a groove in the pons, part of the brainstem.

The basilar sulcus is vertical directed and lies in the midline of the pons on its anterior (front) surface. The basilar artery runs within the basilar sulcus.

The basilar sulcus is bounded on either side by an eminence caused by the descent of the cerebrospinal fibers through the substance of the pons.

Additional images

References

External links
 https://web.archive.org/web/20100426123803/http://anatomy.med.umich.edu/atlas/n2a4p1.html

Pons